This is a list of newspapers in Suriname.

De Ware Tijd (Paramaribo) dwtonline.com
De West (Paramaribo) dagbladdewest.com
Dagblad Suriname (Paramaribo) dbsuriname.com
GFC Nieuws (Paramaribo) gfcnieuws.com
Lam Foeng in Chinese (Paramaribo)
Star Nieuws (Paramaribo) starnieuws.com
Suriname Herald (Paramaribo) srherald.com
Times of Suriname (Paramaribo) surinametimes.com     
United News (Paramaribo) unitednews.sr
Waterkant (Rotterdam, Netherlands) waterkant.net

Suriname Nieuws (srnieuws.com)  collects current articles from these papers.  They have also created an Android app (fathh.com) as well as an online archive of newspaper articles from 2014 to the present.

Magazines

De Vrije Stem (1960-1982)
 OSO (1982-2017) Free download of all editions
Parbode (Paramaribo) parbode.com

See also
List of newspapers

References

Suriname
Newspapers